WURA is a Tejano broadcast radio station licensed to Quantico, Virginia, serving Metro Washington.  WURA is owned and operated by Prince William Broadcasting, LLC.

Broadcast launch
On December 13, 2009, WURA launched broadcasting Christmas music. In January 2010, it converted to a full-time Tejano music format.

Sale
According to radio information website VARTV.com, "WURA is in the process of changing hands from Prince William Broadcasting to Capital Broadcasting VA, LLC. Prince William Broadcasting (which is made up of five partner companies, Dale City Broadcasting 25.5%; Cleo Broadcasting 15%; Bay Broadcasting, Lexington Park Broadcasting and Moonglow Broadcasting each 11.33%.) is selling the station for $205,584."

References

External links
Radio Unida 920 Facebook

URA
Radio stations established in 1984
Spanish-language radio stations in the United States